Flammable solids are any materials in the solid phase of matter that can readily undergo combustion in the presence of a source of ignition under standard circumstances, i.e. without:

Artificially changing variables such as pressure or density; or
Adding accelerants.

Divisions

Division 4.1: Flammable Solid

Flammable solids are any of the following four types of materials:

Desensitized Explosives: explosives that, when dry, are Explosives of Class 1 other than those of compatibility group A, which are wetted with sufficient water, alcohol, or plasticizer to suppress explosive properties; and are specifically authorized by name either in the 49CFR 172.101 Table or have been assigned a shipping name and hazard class by the Associate Administrator for Hazardous Materials Safety.
Self-Reactive Materials: materials that are thermally unstable and that can undergo a strongly exothermic decomposition even without participation of oxygen (air). Certain exclusions to this group do apply under 49 CFR.
Generic Types: Division 4.1 self-reactive materials are assigned to a generic system consisting of seven types. A self-reactive substance identified by technical name in the Self-Reactive Materials Table in 49CFR 173.224 is assigned to a generic type in accordance with that Table. Self-reactive materials not identified in the Self-Reactive Materials Table in 49CFR 173.224 are assigned to generic types under the procedures of paragraph (a)(2)(iii) of this section.
Readily Combustible Solids: materials that are solids which may cause a fire through friction, such as matches; show a burning rate faster than 2.2 mm (0.087 inches) per second when tested in accordance with UN Manual of Tests and Criteria; or are any metal powders that can be ignited and react over the whole length of a sample in 10 minutes or less, when tested in accordance with UN Manual of Tests and Criteria.

Division 4.2: Spontaneously Combustible

Spontaneously combustible material is:

Pyrophoric Material: A pyrophoric material is a liquid or solid that, even in small quantities and without an external ignition source, can ignite within five (5) minutes after coming in contact with air when tested according to the UN Manual of Tests and Criteria.
Self-Heating Material: A self-heating material is a material that, when in contact with air and without an energy supply, is liable to self-heat.

Division 4.3: Dangerous When Wet

Dangerous when wet material is material that, by contact with water, is liable to become spontaneously flammable or to give off flammable or toxic gas at a rate greater than 1 liter per kilogram of the material, per hour, when tested in accordance with the UN Manual of Tests and Criteria. Pure alkali metals are known examples of this.

Placards

Compatibility Table

References

49 CFR 173.124(a)
49 CFR 173.124(b)
49 CFR 173.124(c)

Flammable Solids